is a railway station in the city of Anjō, Aichi Prefecture, Japan, operated by Central Japan Railway Company (JR Tōkai).

Lines

Station layout
The station has four opposed side platforms serving a total of four tracks. The Shinkansen tracks are elevated, and the Tōkaidō line tracks cross underneath. The station building has automated ticket machines, TOICA automated turnstiles and a staffed ticket office.

Platforms

Adjacent stations

|-
!colspan=5|Central Japan Railway Company

Station history
When the Tokaido Shinkansen opened, the distance between Toyohashi Station and Nagoya Station was the second-longest on the route of the line. In 1969, the mayors of Okazaki, Toyota, Anjō, Gamagōri, Nishio, Hekinan, Isshiki, Kira, Kōta, Hazu, Nukata, and Otowa submitted the petition of establishing  in Kota.

These cities and towns formed the "Alliance for Mikawa Station". Kōta town subsequently recommended Ashinoya near Kōda Station. Okazaki city recommended Shōna-chō, Okazaki, Anjō city recommended Furui-chō near Hekikai Furui Station, and Nihongi-chō where the Tōkaidō Shinkansen and Tōkaidō Main Line intersect as possible candidate locations. The alliance entrusted the decision to the Aichi prefectural government. On January 5, 1984, the prefectural government decided to build the station in Nihongi, Anjō. Construction work started on July 29, 1985, and the station was opened on March 13, 1988.

Station numbering was introduced to the section of the Tōkaidō Line operated JR Central in March 2018; Mikawa-Anjō Station was assigned station number CA55.

Passenger statistics
In fiscal 2017, the station was used by an average of 7,186 passengers daily (boarding passengers only).

Surrounding area
Sugi Pharmaceuticals tea office
Tosho head office

See also
 List of railway stations in Japan

References

Yoshikawa, Fumio. Tokaido-sen 130-nen no ayumi. Grand-Prix Publishing (2002) .

External links

  

Railway stations in Japan opened in 1988
Railway stations in Aichi Prefecture
Tōkaidō Main Line
Tōkaidō Shinkansen
Stations of Central Japan Railway Company
Anjō, Aichi